Prodasycnemis  is a genus of moths of the family Crambidae. It contains only one species, Prodasycnemis inornata, which is found in Japan and Russia.

References

Natural History Museum Lepidoptera genus database

Pyraustinae
Crambidae genera
Monotypic moth genera
Taxa named by William Warren (entomologist)